Stacer is an unincorporated community in Scott Township, Vanderburgh County, in the U.S. state of Indiana.

History
An old variant name of the community was called Nash Depot.

A post office was established under the name Nash Depot in 1854, and operated until it was discontinued in 1875. Another post office opened under the name Stacer in 1892, and remained in operation until it was discontinued in 1920. The community was named for Frederick Stacer, an early settler.

Geography

References

Unincorporated communities in Vanderburgh County, Indiana
Unincorporated communities in Indiana